Frederick J. Howell, often known as Dixie Howell (1907 – 11 November 1975), was a British trade unionist.

Howell worked at Smithfield Market in London.  He joined the Transport and General Workers' Union (TGWU), and soon became a shop steward.  He gradually came to prominence, becoming the chair of the union's General Workers Group, and the London representative on the union's National Executive Committee, and served for a period as the vice chair of the union.

In 1970, Howell was elected to the General Council of the Trades Union Congress; he served until his retirement, in September 1974.  He died the following year.

References

1907 births
1975 deaths
British trade unionists
Members of the General Council of the Trades Union Congress